More Deadly Than The Male is a 1919 silent film comedy adventure produced by Famous Players-Lasky and released by Paramount Pictures. Robert G. Vignola directed and Ethel Clayton stars.

Plot
As described in a film magazine, Helen O'Hara (Clayton), actress and manager, is in love with Richard Carlin (Coxen). Richard is a man of the world, more fond of roaming in foreign countries and exploring other lands rather than enjoying the comforts of city or country life. Helen decides to change his habits and make of him a useful citizen. With this purpose, she stages a little drama in which Richard makes ardent love to her and is caught by her husband who is then shot and killed in the encounter that follows. Up to this point all has gone as planned, but the police step in and take Richard into custody. Helen is forced to produce her "dead" brother who played the role of her husband, and explains to the police that it was only a trick. Richard admires the woman's cleverness, admits his love, and decides to forgo any further world travels.

Cast
Ethel Clayton as Helen O'Hara
Edward Coxen as Richard Carlin
Herbert Heyes as Terry O'Hara
Hallam Cooley as Jimmy Keen
Peggy Pearce as Angela

Preservation status
This is now considered to be a lost film.

References

External links

Scene from the film (University of Washington, Sayre collection)

1919 films
American silent feature films
Lost American films
Films directed by Robert G. Vignola
Paramount Pictures films
American black-and-white films
1910s adventure comedy films
American adventure comedy films
1919 comedy films
1910s American films
Silent American comedy films
Silent adventure comedy films